Jenő Váncsa (17 October 1928 – 17 January 2016) was a Hungarian agrarian engineer and former Communist politician, who served as Minister of Agriculture and Food between 1980 and 1989.

On 17 January 2016, he died at the age of 87.

References

Sources
 Bölöny, József – Hubai, László: Magyarország kormányai 1848–2004 [Cabinets of Hungary 1848–2004], Akadémiai Kiadó, Budapest, 2004 (5th edition).

1928 births
2016 deaths
People from Brașov
Members of the Hungarian Socialist Workers' Party
Agriculture ministers of Hungary
Members of the National Assembly of Hungary (1967–1971)
Members of the National Assembly of Hungary (1971–1975)